Yuri Selikhov (born 10 October 1941) is a Russian basketball player. He competed in the men's tournament at the 1968 Summer Olympics.

References

1941 births
Living people
Russian basketball coaches
Russian men's basketball players
Soviet men's basketball players
1967 FIBA World Championship players
Olympic basketball players of the Soviet Union
Basketball players at the 1968 Summer Olympics
Place of birth missing (living people)
Medalists at the 1968 Summer Olympics
Olympic bronze medalists for the Soviet Union
FIBA World Championship-winning players
PBC CSKA Moscow coaches
BC Avtodor coaches